Ballyculter is a civil parish in County Down, Northern Ireland. It is situated in the historic barony of Lecale Lower.

Settlements
The civil parish contains the following settlements:
Strangford

Townlands
Ballyculter civil parish contains the following townlands:

Audleystown
Ballintlieve
Ballyculter Lower
Ballyculter Upper
Ballylenagh
Cargagh
Carrintaggart
Castlemahon
Castleward
Chapel Island
Ferryquarter
Jackdaw Island
Killard Lower
Killard Upper
Lagnagoppoge
Loughkeelan
Raholp
Strangford Lower
Strangford Upper
Tullyratty

See also
List of civil parishes of County Down

References